North Vanlaiphai is a census town in East Lungdar Taluk in the Indian state of Mizoram. In the 2001 census it was listed in Serchhip District; however in the 2011 census it was listed in Champhai District. East Lungdar Taluk is split between the two districts.

Demographics
 India census, North Vanlaiphai had a population of 3,275. Males constitute 51% of the population and females 49%. North Vanlaiphai has an average literacy rate of 84%, higher than the national average of 59.5%: male literacy is 84%, and female literacy is also 84%. 14% of the population is under 6 years of age. By the 2011 census the population had increased to 3,602.

Economy
Vanlaiphai has a flatland measuring 10 kilometers long and 0.8 kilometers in width for rice cultivation. North Vanlaiphai also has a Maicham Small Hydro Project Phase 2 producing 3 MW of power which is about 20 kilometers from Vanlaiphai. Tourism is also being promoted and a Tourist Lodge has been constructed by the Mizoram Government.

References

Cities and towns in Serchhip district